In algebra, a multivariate polynomial
  
This sum  is the weight or the degree of the polynomial.

The term quasi-homogeneous comes from the fact that a polynomial  is quasi-homogeneous if and only if
 
for every  in any field containing the coefficients.

A polynomial  is quasi-homogeneous with weights  if and only if 
 
In particular, a homogeneous polynomial is always quasi-homogeneous, with all weights equal to 1.

A polynomial is quasi-homogeneous if and only if all the  belong to the same affine hyperplane. As the Newton polytope of the polynomial is the convex hull of the set  the quasi-homogeneous polynomials may also be defined as the polynomials that have a degenerate Newton polytope (here "degenerate" means "contained in some affine hyperplane").

Introduction
Consider the polynomial , which is not homogeneous. However, if instead of considering  we use the pair  to test homogeneity, then

We say that  is a quasi-homogeneous polynomial of type
, because its three pairs  of exponents ,  and  all satisfy the linear equation . In particular, this says that the Newton polytope of  lies in the affine space with equation  inside .

The above equation is equivalent to this new one: . Some authors prefer to use this last condition and prefer to say that our polynomial is quasi-homogeneous of type .

As noted above, a homogeneous polynomial  of degree  is just a quasi-homogeneous polynomial of type ; in this case all its pairs of exponents will satisfy the equation .

Definition
Let  be a polynomial in  variables  with coefficients in a commutative ring . We express it as a finite sum

 

 

whenever .

References

Commutative algebra
Algebraic geometry